This is a list of shipwrecks of Oregon. The location is the nearest modern community or primary landmark.

North coast

Central coast

South coast

Rivers

See also 
 Graveyard of the Pacific
 Shipwrecks of the inland Columbia River
 Lists of Oregon-related topics

References

External links 

Shipwrecks map. Northwest Power & Conservation Council. Created 2020-02-07 based on Wikipedia references plus James Gibbs' Pacific Graveyard.

 
Shipwrecks
Oregon